Katherine Woodville may refer to:
Katherine Woodville (actress) (1938–2013), British film and television actress
Catherine Woodville, Duchess of Buckingham (1458–1497), English medieval noblewoman, sister of Elizabeth Woodville, the queen of Edward IV of England
Katherine Neville, Duchess of Norfolk (1397–1483), later Woodville, English courtier of royal descent